Koffi-Amonkro is a town in east-central Ivory Coast. It is a sub-prefecture of Prikro Department in Iffou Region, Lacs District.

Koffi-Amonkro was a commune until March 2012, when it became one of 1126 communes nationwide that were abolished.

In 2014, the population of the sub-prefecture of Koffi-Amonkro was 11,893.

Villages
The 16 villages of the sub-prefecture of Koffi-Amonkro and their population in 2014 are:

References

Sub-prefectures of Iffou
Former communes of Ivory Coast